The Helen Wills Neuroscience Institute (HWNI) at the University of California, Berkeley was created in 1997, through a  bequest from eight-time Wimbledon champion Helen Wills Moody, an alumna of UC Berkeley.

History
The Berkeley Neuroscience Center (BNC) was created in 1997 under the leadership of Professors Carla Shatz and Corey Goodman, who served as the first two Directors from 1997-2001. Neuroscience professors in departments across campus were invited to become faculty in the Center to help recruit new core faculty and to accept graduate students into their labs for training. A $10 million bequest from Olympic gold medalist and 8-time Wimbledon champion Helen Wills Moody endowed the graduate program and provided cash support to grow the Center. On July 1, 2000, it was formally renamed the Helen Wills Neuroscience Institute (HWNI) in honor of this bequest. The Neuroscience PhD Program accepted its first class in Fall 2001.  At any time there are approximately 60 graduate students in the department.

The institute now encompasses over 70 research faculty from many departments including: Molecular & Cellular Biology, Psychology, Integrative Biology, Vision Science, Chemical Engineering, Electrical Engineering & Computer Science, Physics, and Environmental Science, Policy & Management, Haas School of Business, College of Chemistry, School of Public Health, Department of Bioengineering. The institute supports four general subdivisions within neuroscience: Cellular, Cognitive, Developmental, Molecular, and Systems.

Research centers
The Helen Wills Neuroscience Institute currently houses four research centers each with a unique focus on elucidating the functions of the brain.

Brain Imaging Center
The Henry H. "Sam" Wheeler Jr. Brain Imaging Center (BIC) is led by Jack Gallant and Chunlei Liu. This facility houses one of the most powerful (and the most powerful at the time of its installation) human research functional Magnetic Resonance Imaging (fMRI) system in the United States. The 3 tesla magnet provides an opportunity for research collaboration in functional neuroimaging among diverse fields. Data are analyzed at the Judy & John Webb Neuroimaging Computational Facility also housed on the Berkeley campus.

Redwood Center for Theoretical Neuroscience
The Redwood Center for Theoretical Neuroscience became a part of the HWNI on July 1, 2005 after the dissolution of the nonprofit scientific research facility, the Redwood Neuroscience Institute (RNI), once housed in Menlo Park, California. The RNI was established by Jeff Hawkins in August, 2002. Many of the researchers from the RNI joined the University as faculty or staff, and the institute was renamed the Redwood Center for Theoretical Neuroscience. Through the use of various electro- and magnetophysiological techniques, this group hopes to discover an underlying biological mathematics model of memory and cognition.

Institute of Cognitive and Brain Sciences 
The Institute of Cognitive and Brain Sciences (ICBS) became part of the HWNI in September 2009. The ICBS supports research exploring the study of the mind and the biological basis of behavior and mental function. Founded as the Institute for Cognitive Studies in 1984, ICBS adopted its current name in 2000 in recognition of the emergence of cognitive neuroscience as a field for the bi-directional study of mind-brain relationships.

Center for Neural Engineering & Prostheses 
CNEP, led by co-directors Jose Carmena (UCB) and Edward Chang (UCSF) brings together neuroscientists, neurologists, and engineers from UC Berkeley and UCSF to develop breakthrough technologies to restore neural function. CNEP is a non-profit, research-based organization with the ultimate goal of transferring its innovations into common medical practice.

Directors
 1997–1999: Carla Shatz
 1999–2001: 
 2001–2011: Robert T. Knight
 2011–2013: John Ngai
 2013–present: Ehud Isacoff

External links
Helen Wills Neuroscience Institute homepage

Neuroscience research centers in California
University of California, Berkeley
1999 establishments in California
Research institutes in the San Francisco Bay Area